The 26th Chicago Film Critics Association Awards were announced on December 16, 2013. The awards honor the best in film for 2013. The nominations were announced on December 13, 2013.

Winners and nominees
The nominations for the 26th Chicago Film Critics Association Awards are as follows:

Awards

Awards breakdown 
The following films received multiple nominations:

The following films received multiple wins:

References

External links
 

 2013
2013 film awards